Arnaud des Pallières (born 1 December 1961) is a French film director and screenwriter. His film Age of Uprising: The Legend of Michael Kohlhaas was screened in the main competition section at the 2013 Cannes Film Festival.

Filmography

References

External links

1961 births
Living people
French screenwriters
Film directors from Paris